Hypocassida is a genus of leaf beetles belonging to the subfamily Cassidinae.

Genera
 Hypocassida convexipennis Borowiec, 2000 
 Hypocassida cornea (Marseul, 1868) 
 Hypocassida grossepunctata Bordy, 2009 
 Hypocassida meridionalis (Suffrian, 1844) 
 Hypocassida subferruginea (Schrank, 1776

References

External links 
 
 
 Biolib
 Fauna Europaea

Cassidinae
Chrysomelidae genera